Half Tide Rock may refer to several places:
 Half Tide Rock (Tasmania), a small rocky island in south-eastern Australia
 Half Tide Rocks (Massachusetts), a group of small barren rocks in Massachusetts Bay, Boston, Massachusetts, U.S.